Changzhou is a prefecture-level city in Jiangsu, China.

Changzhou may also refer to:
 a historical name of Suzhou, Jiangsu (written as 长洲, different from Changzhou City)
 Changzhou County (长洲), a former county in Suzhou
 Changzhou dialect of Wu Chinese, spoken in Changzhou City
 Changzhou District, in Wuzhou, Guangxi, China
 Changzhou Island, in Guangzhou, Guangdong, China
 Cheung Chau, in Island District, Hong Kong, China